Acorn C/C++ is a set of C/C++ programming tools for use under the  operating system. The tools use the Norcroft compiler suite and were authored by Codemist and Acorn Computers. The tools provide some facilities offered by a fully integrated development environment.

Acorn included a copy of the Norcroft compiler targeted at the ARM architecture for RISC OS in the following development software.

 Acornsoft ANSI C – 1988
 Acornsoft ANSI C (Release 2)
 Acorn ANSI C (Release 3) – 1989
 Acorn Desktop C (Release 4)
 Acorn C/C++ (Release 5) – 1995

History 

Acorn's work on ANSI C compilers was begun around 1987, with a commercial release in 1988 for its Archimedes computer.   and Desktop Assembler were released in 1991. Codemist worked primarily on the ANSI C standard, while Acorn concentrated on the  specifics and optimisation for the ARM. Both parties exchanged sources regularly.

The tools were originally developed by university academics Alan Mycroft and Arthur C Norman of Codemist. Their development was taken up by Acorn and subsequently taken over by Castle Technology, who later added the lacking C99 support. Castle funded further development by means of a subscription scheme. In early 2009, development and sales of the tools were transferred to RISC OS Open.

Subsequent enhancements have included adding the post-ARMv5 instructions to the standalone assembler tool, ObjAsm, and  code generation by the C compiler to use those instructions where natural to do so from the language. In October 2020 a number of extensions to support the C17 standard were made available to developers.

Uses 

The Norcroft compiler can be used to produce  modules, as well as compiling parts of the operating system itself. Before beginning development of the Inform programming language, Graham Nelson originally used  to develop his text adventure Curses.

See also 

Arm Image Format

References

External links 

ROOL Desktop Development Environment – RISC OS Open

C (programming language) compilers
C++ compilers
Proprietary software
RISC OS programming tools
1988 software